Michael Raphael Holmes (born November 18, 1950) is a former professional gridiron football safety and wide receiver who played in the National Football League (NFL), the Canadian Football League (CFL), and the United States Football League (USFL).

Holmes started his career in the National Football League, playing three seasons, mainly for the San Francisco 49ers. He then went to the Canadian Football League where he played six seasons for the Winnipeg Blue Bombers. He was a CFL All Star in 1980. He finished his career with the Washington Federals of the United States Football League in 1983.

References

1950 births
Living people
Sportspeople from Galveston, Texas
American football wide receivers
Texas Southern Tigers football players
San Francisco 49ers players
Buffalo Bills players
Miami Dolphins players
American players of Canadian football
Canadian football wide receivers
Winnipeg Blue Bombers players
Washington Federals/Orlando Renegades players